Kampan may refers to,

 Campanian
 Kampan (Tamil poet)